Euosmylus stellae is an endemic species of New Zealand lacewing that was first described by Robert McLachlan in 1899. The species ranges from the North Island Volcanic Plateau to the middle of the South Island, including Arthur's Pass and the Ashley Gorge. It was named in honour of George Hudson's daughter Stella.

References

Neuroptera
Insects described in 1899
Insects of New Zealand
Taxa named by Robert McLachlan (entomologist)
Endemic insects of New Zealand
Endemic fauna of New Zealand